The Nepean Sailing Club (NSC) is a sailing club located on Lac Deschênes in Ottawa, Ontario, Canada. The club is based in Dick Bell Park, along Carling Avenue, adjacent to Andrew Haydon Park in the former city of Nepean.

History
The club was officially opened on July 29, 1979 with an initial membership of 350. Construction on the original 300 metre breakwater was completed by 1983. Griffiths Rankin Cook Architects won an architectural award in 1990 for the design of the main clubhouse.

Features
The main areas include hand and vehicle launch ramps; green and blue gazebos; Clubhouse, Registration, Office and Washrooms; youth sailing pavilion, first aid, washrooms, changing facility; wheelchair pathway; parking and dock access.

Life at the Club

Enrolment
Membership today is almost 1900 members. The club maintains its emphasis on sailing. The club has floating dock facilities for over 500 boats. The club also maintains an active dry sail program for day-sailing.

Programs

The sailing season extends from mid-April to late October. Sail training programs are active during the summer months for both youth and adults.

Every year the club hosts sailing regattas that attract sailors from across Canada and internationally. The local racing scene consists of fleet, PY and PHRF races on an almost daily basis along with special racing events on weekends throughout the season. Many racing events are held in cooperation with the nearby Britannia Yacht Club (BYC) and Club de Voile Grande-Rivière (CVGR).

Mondays typically see the women's racing. Tuesdays are PHRF. Wednesdays see 5o5s, Lasers racing one design, catamarans, and Albacores and Fireballs combining for handicap racing. Thursdays see C&C27s, Tanzer 22s, and Sharks race one design, J24s and Kirby 25s racing level, with three fleets of JAM (jib and main) racing PHRF.  A distance race or regatta can be observed almost every weekend.

The Nepean Sailing Club also maintains an active Able Sail program with a fleet of Martin 16 boats, wheel-chair access, and an active team of volunteers who escort the boats.

A number of trophies and awards are presented for evening and series events in addition to the trophies listed in Special events. The aggregate trophies awarded on basis of points earned in evening and weekend events include the Nautilus Trophy, Journal Trophy, Kelpie Cup, C&C 27 Overall Champion, and Jam Dish. Interclub awards are scored for series racing: The Chandlery Cup, Kirby 25 Best Performance Trophy, Authentic Yachts Trophy, NSC Beagle Bown, and Keepers.

Evening Series Calendar
Mondays typically see the women's PHRF racing and the skiffs and Lasers racing.  Tuesdays are PHRF keelboats. Wednesdays see 5o5s, Lasers racing one design, catamarans, and Albacores and Fireballs combining for handicap racing. Thursdays see C&C27s, Tanzer 22s, Sharks, Mirage 24s race one design with three fleets of jib and main (JAM) racing PHRF.  NSC has a racing program involving both (PHRF and JAM fleets). NSC fields teams to compete against other clubs in team racing. BYC has a regular weekday evening racing schedule and a weekend racing schedule organized by the membership. Members of the NSC High Performance Team have the opportunity to learn what it is like to compete against the best in the world, and the experience they gain at races and regattas will certainly help them as they progress in their sailing careers.

Weekend and Special Events
A distance race or regatta can be observed almost every weekend. Some events are open to any member of a club of the Canadian Yachting Association. Some events are interclub, which means that boats from all sailing clubs on Lac Deschênes may participate. Many racing events are held in cooperation with the nearby Britannia Yacht Club and Club de voile Grande-Rivière. BYC & NSC have a schedule of cruising and day sailing events organized by the membership for fun, as memorials for members who serve in the Canadian Forces, and as fundraisers for local charities.

The Galley

Nepean Sailing Club also features a restaurant named "The Galley". It is open to the public, and features a patio overlooking the harbour. The Galley can be found on the upper floor of the clubhouse, and has a large room that can be rented for events.

Wildlife

For birdwatchers, species in or passing through the area include Arctic tern, black tern, New World blackbirds,  black brant, Canada geese, common goldeneye, common merganser, common tern, double-crested cormorants, great blue heron, green-winged teal, gulls, killdeer, northern pintails, rails, red-throated loon, ring-billed gull, songbirds, spotted sandpiper, swallows, loggerhead shrike, least bittern, and wood ducks.  The fish species in the Ottawa River near BYC include brown trout, small mouth bass and walleye.
The reptiles, amphibians, and salamanders include American eels, American ginseng, American bullfrog, green frog,  mudpuppy, painted turtles, snapping turtles, spotted turtle, and spring peeper. The mammals in the area include beaver, coyotes, eastern chipmunks, mink, muskrat, otter, porcupine, raccoons, red foxes, red squirrels, and woodchucks.

Partnerships

As a Provincial Training Centre for 2012, NSC supports the training of Athletes at the Olympic level. As a Development Training Centre for 2012, NSC supports the training of Athletes from the Grassroots to the National Team Level and supports the development of Coaches from Level 1 (CANSail 1&2) to Level 4-5.

The Britannia Yacht Club is developing a joint marketing campaign with the Nepean Sailing Club to increase awareness of recreational and competitive sailing in Ottawa.

Through Advantage Boating, there are adult and children`s Learn to Sail Programs.

References

External links 

Yacht clubs in Canada
Sport in Ottawa
Buildings and structures in Ottawa
Culture of Ottawa
Education in Ottawa
Geography of Ottawa
Organizations based in Ottawa
Sports venues in Ottawa
Sports clubs established in 1979
1979 establishments in Ontario